Broadway Dance Center is a dance school located at 322 West 45th Street west of Times Square in New York City. It was founded in 1984 as one of the first "drop-in" dance training schools in the world, offering classes in  jazz, tap, ballet, contemporary, hip hop and theater.

Dancers and performers such as Bette Midler, Brooke Shields, Jennifer Jones, Britney Spears, Madonna, *NSYNC, Camille Kostek, Jason Samuels Smith, and Elizabeth Berkley have taken class or rehearsed at the school with Broadway performers taking classes there daily.<ref
name="New York"></ref><ref
name="Dancer Universe"> </ref>

History 
In New York City in the early 1980s, aspiring dancers primarily came to NYC to vie for the chance to dance on a Broadway stage. Choreographers like Michael Bennett, Bob Fosse and Jerome Robbins were creating brilliance on stage, while teachers like Luigi, Charles Kelley, Jamie Rogers, Henry LeTang, Phil Black, David Howard and Frank Hatchett were preparing dancers to become the versatile technical performers needed by these great choreographers.

Long-time New York City resident Richard Ellner took his first tap class at 52 years of age. He was a great fan of Broadway musicals, such as Dancin, Sophisticated Ladies, The Tap Dance Kid, and Cats. He was a business executive who fueled his love of the arts by taking jazz and tap classes. Ellner took his first jazz class with Francine Sama (aka Frankie Anne) when the studio site at 1733 Broadway was known as Jo Jo's Dance Factory.  Ellner's desire to expand his training led him to the legendary jazz teacher Frank Hatchett at Hines-Hatchett. He later took on this location, newly named Hines & Hatchett, which was co-owned by Hatchett and Maurice Hines.

In the '80s, Hines-Hatchett was like many small studios throughout the city. Studio owners had the demanding dual role of teaching while administrating their schools.

In 1984, Ellner assumed ownership of Hines-Hatchett, renamed it Broadway Dance Center, and set off to create a studio that would provide a new home for teachers and dancers. Each instructor was encouraged to contribute his or her personal style and expertise. Students enjoyed the convenience of frequenting one studio for diversified training rather than traveling throughout the city.

In the early years, renowned teachers joined BDC's faculty and solidified the studio's standing in the dance community. A strong word-of-mouth brought students from around the globe. Ellner wished to share the joy of dance class with everyone, not only professionals.

Over the next fifteen years, the studio grew from a one-story building to three stories of creative and business space, and flourished under Ellner's leadership. His daughter Allison came on board and together they formed a strong partnership.

In 1998, the property the studio rented was sold to make way for a high-rise/office building. Being uprooted and forced to relocate, the studio faced a challenging and disappointing time. Ellner died just three weeks after the move to 57th Street, at the age of 69, of a heart attack. The responsibility of securing the studio's future fell to Allison, who wanted to honor her father's legacy.

After seven successful years at 57th Street, BDC was again faced with the dilemma of being forced to relocate in 2006. After a short interim period and with support from the dance community, faculty and staff, BDC was able to rebuild its current state-of-the-art facility in the heart of Times Square. In August 2017, a second location was opened focusing on children and teen dancers near Lincoln Center.

Broadway Dance Center expanded the space on 45th Street to seven studios. It now offers over 350 drop-in classes each week for dancers over age 13.

Training programs 
The center offers drop-in classes and other opportunities to dance. Summer Session is an eight-week program of 12 classes for dancers ages 18–27. There are also mock auditions and performance opportunities. Dancers receive a certificate after successfully completing the program. In some cases, the Summer Session can count as college credit.

Professional Semester is a four-month program designed for experienced dancers who are age 18–27. This consists of technique classes in multiple disciplines, mock auditions, seminars, and several networking possibilities for young dancers to establish themselves in the industry.

BDC also offers programs specifically for international dancers. The International Student Visa Program (ISVP) for dancers over age 18, and the ISVP Professional Semester for ages 18–27, allow students from countries outside of the United States to experience training at BDC. Depending on the duration of the program, the cost for tuition can range from $6,000 to $24,000, which does not include other living expenses. Tuition for the ISVP Professional Semester is $3,850 for the four-month program.

Youth programs are also offered at BDC. The Junior Training Program consists of three-week or six-week periods in which experienced dancers, age 13–17, can choose 15 classes per week from a variety of different genres and teachers and focus on a specific style of dance. BDC also has one-week summer dance camps, four-day summer workshops, and a summer intensive for children ages 6–11.

Class levels 
 Basic - 0–2 years of training
 Beginner - 2–5 years of training with basic understanding of discipline and general dance terminology
 Advanced Beginner - 5–8 years of training with complete understanding of discipline and general dance terminology
 Intermediate - 8–10 years of training
 Intermediate/Advanced - 8–10 years of training
 Advanced - 10+ years of training, pre-professional and professional

References

External links 
 BDC website

1984 establishments in New York City
Dance in New York City
Dance schools in the United States